Shilovo is a rural locality (a village) in Kubenskoye Rural Settlement, Vologodsky District, Vologda Oblast, Russia. The population was 4 as of 2002.

Geography 
Shilovo is located 45 km northwest of Vologda (the district's administrative centre) by road. Sarayevo is the nearest rural locality.

References 

Rural localities in Vologodsky District